Kulesze Kościelne  is a village in Wysokie Mazowieckie County, Podlaskie Voivodeship, in north-eastern Poland. It is the seat of the gmina (administrative district) called Gmina Kulesze Kościelne.

References

Villages in Wysokie Mazowieckie County